The following are the winners of the 32nd annual Origins Award, held in 2006:

Hall of Fame inductees
 Aaron Allston
 Jolly R. Blackburn
 Rodger MacGowan
 Dennis Mize (posthumous)
 Mike Pondsmith
 James Ernest

Hall of Fame Game inductees
 Star Fleet Battles

External links
 2005 Origins Awards
 

2005 awards
 
2005 awards in the United States